Jaroslav Starý may refer to:

 Jaroslav Starý (fencer) (died 1989), Czech fencer
 Jaroslav Starý (footballer) (born 1988), Czech footballer